Agnes of Aquitaine (– ) was Queen of Aragon during her brief marriage to King Ramiro II, a former monk. The couple separated after the birth of their only child, Queen Petronilla, and retired to monasteries. Agnes chose the Abbey of Fontevraud, from where she continued to take part in the affairs of her sons from her first marriage to Viscount Aimery V of Thouars.

First marriage
Agnes was the daughter of Duke William IX of Aquitaine and Countess Philippa of Toulouse. She was the namesake of her aunt Agnes, wife of King Peter I of Aragon and Navarre. Her first marriage, to Viscount Aimery V of Thouars, was celebrated some time prior to 9 January 1117, when the couple confirmed the possessions of the abbey of Saint-Laon de Thouars. Before Aimery's death in 1127, the couple had three sons:
 William I (died 1151), succeeded his father
 Guy, lord of Oiron (died c. 1149)
 Geoffrey IV (died 1173), succeeded William

Second marriage
On 13 November 1135 in the cathedral of Jaca, the ancient capital of the Kingdom of Aragon, Agnes married King Ramiro II, a monk who had resigned the bishopric of Roda in order to succeed his childless brother Alfonso the Battler. The anonymous contemporary author of the Chronica Adefonsi imperatoris attributes the initiative in Ramiro's marriage to the Aragonese:
They elected Alfonso's brother king. This man was a monk, and his name was Ramiro. They gave him the sister of the Count of Poitiers for a wife. Even though this was a great sin, the Aragonese did it, for they had lost their king and hoped that there would be an offspring from the royal family. . . King Ramiro went to his wife, and she conceived and gave birth to a daughter. . . He transferred the kingdom to his daughter and acknowledged his sins. He then did penance.
Agnes' age (approximately thirty) and proven fertility in her prior marriage were probably the main reasons the Aragonese sought her out. Agnes' brother, Duke William X, was also one of the few regional supporters of Antipope Anacletus II, who, as the weaker claimant to the papacy, might be persuaded to support Ramiro's irregular (and uncanonical) accession. Agnes' dowry was a church at Loscertales.

In a document from the same month as his marriage, Ramiro declares that he "took a wife not out of carnal lust, but for the restoration of the blood and the lineage" (uxorem quoque non carnis libidine, set sanguinis ac proienici restauratione duxi). Later medieval and early modern historians, embarrassed by the disregard for canon law, invented explanations to reconcile the marriage of a bishop with what was current in their own day. The fourteenth-century Chronicle of San Juan de la Peña records that messengers were sent to the pope to obtain the proper dispensation. The Aragonese translation of the same chronicle places Ramiro's religious status in doubt ("some chronicles say that he was not in holy orders", algunas cronónicas dizen que no era en sacres órdenes). At the Second Lateran Council in 1139, the church, perhaps influenced by the case of Ramiro and Agnes, declared the marriages of clerics to be null and void. Prior to this, they were legitimate, but illegal, marriages.

Queenship
The first known royal diploma in which Agnes appears as queen is an original dated 29 January 1136. By August Agnes had borne a daughter, Petronilla. Agnes' last appearance in an Aragonese document is from October 1136: a joint donation with her husband of a mill and a horse at Loscertales to the monastery of San Pedro de Antefruenzo. She and Ramiro may have separated shortly after this. Her brother died on a pilgrimage to Santiago de Compostela on 3 April 1137. It was probably during his passage through Iberia that his consent to the proposed marriage of the infant Petronilla was obtained; there is no evidence that Agnes took any part in arranging the future of her daughter.

In a series of acts between 11 August and 13 November 1137, Ramiro betrothed his daughter to the powerful Count Raymond Berengar IV of Barcelona, made his subjects swear an oath of allegiance to the count and then handed over the royal power to him. The transfer of power done, Ramiro returned to religious life and Agnes retired to the Abbey of Fontevraud, where her mother had lived. She is recorded there between 1141 and 1147, and there she died around 1159.

References

Sources

See also
Dukes of Aquitaine family tree

People from Aquitaine
Aragonese queen consorts
House of Poitiers
1100s births
1150s deaths
Year of birth uncertain
Year of death uncertain
12th-century people from the Kingdom of Aragon
12th-century Spanish women
12th-century French people
12th-century French women
Queen mothers